Sigma Gamma Chi was a fraternal organization sponsored by the Church of Jesus Christ of Latter-day Saints (LDS Church). Though it once was a national organization, it later only operated at the University of Utah. Sigma Gamma Chi stands for "Service to God and Country".

History

Sigma Gamma Chi originated with Lambda Delta Sigma, a fraternity for Latter-day Saints founded in 1936 by Lowell L. Bennion, director of the University of Utah's Institute of Religion.  Soon afterwards it also admitted women into its membership.  In 1967 the LDS Church assumed management and divided the organization, making Lambda Delta Sigma a sorority and creating Sigma Gamma Chi as its fraternity.

For decades the organization expanded and grew, creating new chapters within Sigma Gamma Chi and the sister organization Lambda Delta Sigma, and women outnumbered men 6 to 1. There were several charters at campuses throughout the United States.  The fraternity's community service projects included repairs to the Jewish Community Center and creating Christmas baskets for the needy. It also sponsored dances and parties for young men to socialize with young women.

In 1978, Sigma Gamma Chi absorbed Delta Phi Kappa, the fraternity for returned missionaries.  By 1999 it held 15,000 members in 105 chapters, and in 2000 the fraternity itself was absorbed by the Institute Men's Association, a church organization for all Young Single Adults.

Church leadership eventually replaced Sigma Gamma Chi with the Latter-day Saint Student Association (LDSSA).  In contrast to the fraternity's student elections, the LDSSA officers were church callings chosen by the presiding Institute of Religion director at the University of Utah.  The student-run fraternity and sorority chapters were removed from the LDS Institutes of Religion.  In the end, only the University of Utah was authorized to host Sigma Gamma Chi.  However, its expansion was restricted because of a ban on new fraternity and sorority campus housing on Greek Row at the University of Utah, due in part to a Salt Lake City law passed in the 1980s.

As of 10 June 2011, Sigma Gamma Chi was no longer in operation.

Organization
At the University of Utah Sigma Gamma Chi (ΣΓΧ) was composed of twelve chapters (Alpha, Beta, Chi, Delta, Iota, Mu, Nu, Pi, Rho, Sigma, Phi and Xi).  Chapters typically met each week on either Wednesday or Thursday night.  These meetings were held at the LDS Institute of Religion to the South of The U of U campus  (1780 E South Campus Dr).  Sigma Gamma Chi was led by the Inter Chapter Council composed of a president and officers he selects from the twelve chapters.  Each chapter was led individually by a Chapter President, who assigned other officers from within the chapter.

A new president of Sigma Gamma Chi was called annually to replace the previous president. Officer positions also included VP, Secretary, and Pledge trainer. Learning the Greek alphabet, and many other parts of fraternity life were required and expected of the pledges.

Chapters
Schools with Sigma Gamma Chi included:
Arizona State University
Boise State University
Dixie State University
Fullerton City College/California State University Fullerton
University of Idaho 
Orange Coast College
Ricks College
Long Beach City College
LDS Business College
San Diego State University
University of Southern California
Southern Utah State College
University of New Mexico - Single chapter with 3 Greek letter designation: Mu Eta Pi 
University of Wyoming
University of Utah
Weber State College
Salt Lake Community College 

Chapters of Sigma Gamma Chi at the University of Utah: Alpha, Beta, Chi, Delta, Iota, Mu, Nu, Pi, Rho, Sigma, Xi

See also
LDS Student Association
W. Rolfe Kerr

External links
 September 1986 Ensign 'The LDS “Greeks”: Lambda Delta Sigma and Sigma Gamma Chi'

Notes

1936 establishments in Utah
1967 establishments in Utah
Organizational subdivisions of the Church of Jesus Christ of Latter-day Saints
Young people and the Church of Jesus Christ of Latter-day Saints
The Church of Jesus Christ of Latter-day Saints in Utah
Latter Day Saint fraternities and sororities in the United States
Student organizations established in 1936
Christian organizations established in 1936
Organizations disestablished in 1967
Defunct fraternities and sororities